Fresh Meat may refer to:

Film and television
 Fresh Meat (TV series), a British comedy-drama
 Real World/Road Rules Challenge: Fresh Meat, the twelfth season of the American show Real World/Road Rules Challenge
 The Challenge: Fresh Meat II, the nineteenth season of the MTV reality television game show, The Challenge, and the sequel to Real World/Road Rules Challenge: Fresh Meat
 Fresh Meat (film), a New Zealand horror comedy film

Other uses
 Fresh Meat (album), the debut album of Arkarna
 FreshMeat, the former name of the software website Freecode, owned by Geeknet

See also
 Meat, animal flesh used as food